Melt may refer to:

Science and technology
 Melting, in physics, the process of heating a solid substance to a liquid
 Melt (manufacturing), the semi-liquid material used in steelmaking and glassblowing
 Melt (geology), magma
 Melt inclusions, a feature of igneous rock
 Meltwater, water released from the thawing of snow and ice
 MLT framework, a software test tool for the Media Lovin' Toolkit
 Melt, one of the former names for the American social media app Gas.

Music
 Melt! Festival, an annual music festival at Ferropolis in Germany

Albums
 Melt (Straitjacket Fits album), a 1990 album by Straitjacket Fits
 Melt (Rascal Flatts album), a 2002 album by Rascal Flatts
 Melt, a 2018 extended play by Shaed, featuring the song "Trampoline"
 Melt (Peter Gabriel album), an alternative name of the third self-titled Peter Gabriel album, from 1980

Songs
 "Melt!" (Siouxsie and the Banshees song), a 1982 song by Siouxsie and the Banshees
 "Melt" (Melanie C song), a 2003 song by Melanie C
 "Melt", a song by Big Red Machine from their self-titled album
 "Melt", a song by the band Supercell from their album Supercell

People
 Melt van Schoor (born 1967), South Africa-born Namibian cricketer
 Melt Sieberhagen, South African actor

Other uses
 Melt sandwich or cheese melt, a grilled sandwich

See also
 
 
 Melty (disambiguation)
 Smelt (disambiguation)